Virtuoso No. 4 is an album by jazz guitarist Joe Pass that was recorded in 1973 and released in 1983.

It was re-issued in 1993 on CD with three additional tracks ("Weaselocity", "Blues for Pete", and "What Are You Doing the Rest of Your Life?"). Virtuoso No. 4 differs from the three previous Virtuoso releases in that it is performed on acoustic guitar instead of electric (with the exception of "Indian Summer").

Reception

Writing for Allmusic, music critic Scott Yanow wrote of the album "The relatively little-known set finds the guitarist sounding very much like a self-sufficient orchestra, and although his tone is necessarily softer on acoustic than electric, he swings hard on the uptempo pieces."

Track listing
"Lush Life" (Billy Strayhorn) – 4:55
"Indian Summer" (Victor Herbert, Al Dubin) – 3:16
"Autumn Leaves" (Joseph Kosma, Jacques Prévert, Johnny Mercer)  – 5:40
"Yesterday" (Lennon–McCartney) – 4:24
"Come Sunday" (Duke Ellington) – 3:46
"Lover Man" (Jimmy Davis, Ram Ramirez, James Sherman) – 6:18
"Come Rain or Come Shine" (Harold Arlen, Mercer) – 3:37
"My Shining Hour" (Arlen, Mercer) – 4:25
"I'll Remember April" (Gene de Paul, Patricia Johnston, Don Raye) – 4:55
"Some Day My Prince Will Come" (Frank Churchill, Larry Morey)  – 3:21
"Weaselocity" (Joe Pass) – 6:54
"Acoustic Blues" (Pass) – 6:46
"I Can't Get Started" (Ira Gershwin, Vernon Duke) – 4:10
"It's a Wonderful World" (Harold Adamson, Jan Savitt, Johnny Watson) – 3:20
"Now's the Time" (Charlie Parker) – 7:03
"The Man I Love" (George Gershwin, Ira Gershwin) – 5:47
"The Nearness of You" (Hoagy Carmichael, Ned Washington) – 4:03
"Limehouse Blues" (Philip Braham, Douglas Furber) – 4:46
"Easy Living" (Ralph Rainger, Leo Robin) – 6:57
"Blues for Pete" (Pass) – 3:21
"What Are You Doing the Rest of Your Life?" (Alan Bergman, Marilyn Bergman, Michel Legrand) – 5:28

Personnel
Joe Pass - guitar
Norman Granz – producer

References

1983 albums
Joe Pass albums
Albums produced by Norman Granz
Pablo Records albums
Instrumental albums